William Donald Stewart (born October 6, 1957) is a Canadian-born Italian former professional ice hockey defenceman and former coach. He played in the National Hockey League between 1977 and 1986, and then played in the Italian Serie A from 1986 to 1995. He later became a coach for the New York Islanders during the 1998–99 season. Internationally Stewart played for the Italian national team at the 1992 and 1994 Winter Olympics, and two World Championships.

Playing career
As a youth, Stewart played in the 1969 Quebec International Pee-Wee Hockey Tournament with a minor ice hockey team from York Mills. A native of Toronto, Ontario, he was drafted in the fourth round (68th overall) in the 1977 NHL Entry Draft by the Buffalo Sabres and started his National Hockey League career in 1977-78. He also went on to play for the St. Louis Blues, Toronto Maple Leafs, and Minnesota North Stars. He left the NHL at the end of the 1985–86 season choosing to play hockey in Italy until his retirement in 1995.

Coaching career
Stewart began his professional coaching career with the Muskegon Fury of the Colonial Hockey League in 1995. After one season with Muskegon, Stewart took the head coaching position with the Oshawa Generals of the OHL in 1996. Stewart got back into coaching professional hockey the following season with a stint in the American Hockey League and coaching the Saint John Flames to the Calder Cup Finals in 1998, losing to the Philadelphia Phantoms in six games.

Stewart was named head coach of the New York Islanders on January 21, 1999 after Mike Milbury himself stepped down to concentrate solely on his GM duties. After finishing the season with the Islanders, Stewart was relieved of his coaching duties and was replaced by Butch Goring on April 30, 1999.

In 1999, Stewart returned to the OHL to become the head coach of the Barrie Colts. The roster that year included the four "Brampton Boys", one of whom, Ryan Barnes, faced charges of assault with a weapon after a stick-swinging incident during a game in October. Later in the season, three of the team's other players were charged with sexual assault. Finally, Stewart himself made headlines and was banned from entering the United States for twice smuggling a Ukrainian-born player over the Canada-U.S. border in the baggage compartment of the team bus. Stewart infamously walked out of the Halifax Metro Centre without conducting any interviews with the media, following Barrie's 6-2 loss to the Rimouski Océanic in the 2000 Memorial Cup championship game.

Following the controversial season in Barrie, Stewart continued his coaching career in Germany, and made headlines during the DEL quarterfinals in 2001 when he was involved in a mass brawl in game three against the Berlin Capitals, during which he hit Capitals' head coach Pavel Gross in the head and Stewart was injured as well. He was handed a two-game suspension and a DM 15,000 fine. In the finals against the München Barons, he feigned fainting behind the Adler Mannheim bench to buy his star player Jan Alston time to get his skates sharpened. His team ended up winning the championship that year and got to the finals the following season. Stewart left Mannheim in January 2003 after being informed that his contract would not be extended at the end of the season.

After a short stint in Krefeld, Stewart moved to Austria, where he coached the Graz 99ers and EHC Linz. He left Linz in December 2006 to return to Germany with the Hamburg Freezers. Linz challenged this transfer by seeking a restraining order, but lost the case. Stewart was sacked by the Freezers in December 2008.

On December 3, 2009, he agreed to take over as the head coach of Kölner Haie and was relieved of his duties in November 2011. He joined the Guelph Storm during the 2011-12 season as a consultant prior to being named assistant coach in 2012-13. He took over as interim head coach of the team in January 2015. The term "interim" was then removed prior to the end of the season. He resigned from the Storm in December 2015 after only two wins and went back to Germany in January 2016 to coach Dresdner Eislöwen of the DEL2.

Stewart was appointed head coach of the DEL's Straubing Tigers in April 2017. Concerning his past, he stated at that time: "I have experienced a lot in Europe, have had great success, but have to admit that I have gone too far at times. These moments happened some years ago and, in the meantime, I have learned and become more quiet." He was sacked as Straubing head coach on October 18, 2017 after his team won only five of the first 13 games of the season and dropped to the very bottom of the DEL standings.

On December 4, 2017, Stewart was named head of Adler Mannheim, returning for a second stint in charge at the club. His contract expired at the end of the 2017-18 season in which he guided the Adler team to an appearance in the playoff semifinals. He subsequently worked as a scout for the Adler organization.

Career statistics

Regular season and playoffs

International

NHL Coaching statistics

NHL coaching statistics

Awards and achievements 
 1997–98 - Louis A. R. Pieri Memorial Award - Saint John Flames

Transactions
 October 30, 1980 - Traded by the Buffalo Sabres to the St. Louis Blues for Bob Hess and a 4th round pick in the 1981 NHL Entry Draft (Anders Wikberg)
 September 10, 1983 - Signed as a free agent by the Toronto Maple Leafs
 September 15, 1985 - Signed as a free agent by the Minnesota North Stars

References

External links
 

1957 births
Living people
Barrie Colts coaches
Brunico SG players
Buffalo Sabres draft picks
Buffalo Sabres players
Canadian expatriate ice hockey players in Italy
Canadian expatriate ice hockey players in the United States
Canadian ice hockey coaches
Canadian ice hockey defencemen
Courmaosta HC players
Ice hockey players at the 1992 Winter Olympics
Ice hockey players at the 1994 Winter Olympics
HC Milano Saima players
Hershey Bears players
Kitchener Rangers players
Minnesota North Stars players
Niagara Falls Flyers players
New York Islanders coaches
Olympic ice hockey players of Italy
Rochester Americans players
St. Catharines Black Hawks players
St. Catharines Saints players
St. Louis Blues players
Salt Lake Golden Eagles (CHL) players
Ice hockey people from Toronto
Springfield Indians players
Toronto Maple Leafs players
HC Gardena players
Winnipeg Jets (WHA) draft picks